The referendary (Latin: referendarius; French: référendaire) was the officer of the palace in the Merovingian period who made the report of the royal letters in the chancelleries, so as to decide whether they should be signed and sealed.

They were frequently also the Lord Chancellors serving the Merovingian dynasty.

Referendaries
Known referendaries include:
 Saint Rémigius, Bishop of Reims (497–533)
 Siggo, in the courts of Sigebert I, then Chilperic I and finally Childebert II (561)
 Ansbert, Bishop of Rouen, in the court of Clothar II (dates as référendaire unknown)
 Audoin, Bishop of Rouen (641–689), Grand Référendaire of Dagobert I and Clovis II from 638 to 657
 Robert I, Bishop of Tours, in the courts of Dagobert I and Clovis II (through 663)
 Bonitus, Bishop of Auvergne, in the court of Sigebert III, King of Austrasia
 Robert II, also Chancellor to Clothaire III (through 677).

Undoubtedly, many of the other lord chancellors were also référendaire, but none are recorded as such.

See also
 
 Royal Administration of Merovingian and Carolingian Dynasties.

References 
Bluche, François. L'Ancien Régime: Institutions et société. Collection: Livre de poche, Fallois, Paris, 1993
Fouracre, Paul and Gerberding, Richard A., Late Merovingian France, Manchester University Press, Manchester, 1996
Ordericus Vitalis. Forester, Thomas, ed. The Ecclesiastical History of England and Normandy, Henry G. Bohn, London, 1854

People of the Merovingian Kingdom
Merovingian referendaries
Frankish nobility